Rhamnogalacturonan hydrolase (rhamnogalacturonase A, RGase A, RG-hydrolase) is an enzyme with systematic name rhamnogalacturonan alpha-D-GalA-(1->2)-alpha-L-Rha hydrolase. This enzyme catalyses the following chemical reaction

 Endohydrolysis of alpha-D-GalA-(1->2)-alpha-L-Rha glycosidic bond in the rhamnogalacturonan I backbone with initial inversion of anomeric configuration releasing oligosaccharides with beta-D-GalA at the reducing end.

The enzyme is part of the degradation system for rhamnogalacturonan I in Aspergillus aculeatus.

References

External links 
 

EC 3.2.1